Julius Jolly may refer to:
Julius Jolly (Indologist) (1849–1932), German academic and Indologist
Julius Jolly (politician) (1823–1891), German politician